Etobicoke Centre is a federal electoral district in Ontario, Canada, that has been represented in the House of Commons of Canada since 1979.

Geography
The riding includes the neighbourhoods of Eatonville (part), Islington-City Centre West (part), Richview, Humber Heights - Westmount, Eringate – Centennial – West Deane, Markland Wood, Princess Gardens, Thorncrest Village and Humber Valley Village in the former city of Etobicoke, Toronto.

History

The riding was created in 1976 from part of the Etobicoke riding in what was then a constituent municipality of Metropolitan Toronto.

On May 18, 2012, the Ontario Superior Court declared the 2011 federal election results for this district to be null and void. The judge ruled that 79 votes should not have been counted when the margin of victory in the riding was only 26 votes. On May 28, 2012, however, the incumbent Member of Parliament, Ted Opitz, filed an appeal with the Supreme Court of Canada.  On October 25, 2012, the Supreme Court allowed Mr. Opitz's appeal and quashed the order for a by-election.  In its decision, the Supreme Court restored 59 of the 79 tossed votes, essentially leaving Mr. Optiz with a 6 vote margin of victory.

This riding lost territory to Etobicoke North and gained territory from Etobicoke—Lakeshore during the 2012 electoral redistribution.

Members of Parliament

It has elected five members of the House of Commons of Canada:

Demographics 
According to the Canada 2021 Census

Ethnic groups: 67.4% White, 7.1% Black, 6.7% South Asian, 4.0% Latin American, 3.1% Chinese, 2.9% Filipino, 1.7% Korean, 1.2% Southeast Asian, 1.1% West Asian, 1.0% Arab

Languages: 52.7% English, 4.2% Italian, 3.6% Ukrainian, 3.4% Spanish, 2.8% Portuguese, 2.6% Polish, 2.5% Serbian, 1.4% Russian, 1.4% Tagalog, 1.4% Albanian, 1.3% Korean, 1.1% Mandarin

Religions: 67.8% Christian (41.2% Catholic, 7.6% Christian Orthodox, 3.0% Anglican, 2.8% United Church, 1.4% Presbyterian, 11.8% Other), 6.9% Muslim, 2.5% Hindu, 1.2% Buddhist, 20.3% None

Median income: $44,400 (2020)

Average income: $69,200 (2020)

Election results

Toronto City Council Wards 3-4

Since 2000 Toronto City Council Wards 3 and 4 shares the same name.

 Ward 3
Stephen Holyday 2014–present
Peter Leon 2013-2014
Doug Holyday 2000-2013
Ward 4
John Campbell 2014–present
Gloria Lindsay Luby 2000-2014

See also
 List of Canadian federal electoral districts
 Past Canadian electoral districts

References

House of Commons of Canada historical ridings section
2011 Results from Elections Canada, Results certified by judicial recount
 Campaign expense data from Elections Canada

Notes

Etobicoke
Federal electoral districts of Toronto
Ontario federal electoral districts
1976 establishments in Ontario